The Roman Catholic Archdiocese of New York covers New York, Bronx, and Richmond Counties in New York City (coterminous with the boroughs of Manhattan, the Bronx, and Staten Island, respectively), as well as Dutchess, Orange, Putnam, Rockland, Sullivan, Ulster, and Westchester counties in New York state. In these ten counties in the state, there are 296 parishes, along with a number of parish missions.

To see churches that have been canonically suppressed, please review the List of closed churches in the Roman Catholic Archdiocese of New York. Please be aware that in 2015, a number of parishes in the Archdiocese of New York were permanently closed and merged with other parishes. This list may not accurately represent the current status of some parishes in the Archdiocese.

Active Churches in the Archdiocese

Churches in New York City
This is a list of churches in the boroughs of The Bronx, Manhattan, and Staten Island. The churches in the boroughs of Brooklyn and Queens belong to the Roman Catholic Diocese of Brooklyn.

Churches in the Bronx
 Church of the Sacred Heart (Bronx) (1253 W 168th Street) – Established in 1910
 Christ the King's Church (Bronx) (Grand Concourse at Marcy Pl.) – Established in 1927
 Fordham University Church - Established in 1845, Campus church of Fordham University. Also known as "Old St. John's." Staffed by the Jesuit Fathers.
 Holy Cross Church (Bronx) (600 Soundview Ave.) – Established in 1921
 Our Lady of Mercy's Church (Bronx) (2496 Marion Ave.) – Established in 1907.
 Our Lady of Mount Carmel's Church (Bronx) (627 E. 187th St.) – Established in 1906.
 Our Lady of the Nativity of Our Blessed Lady's Church (Bronx) (1510 E 233rd Street and Secor Av)
 Our Lady of Refuge Church (Bronx) (197th Street and Bainbridge Ave)
 Our Lady of Solace's Church (Bronx) (731 Morris Park Ave.) – Established 1903; staffed by the Idente Missionaries.
 Santa Maria Church (2352 St. Raymonds Ave.) - Established in 1926; staffed by the Idente Missionaries.
 St. Angela Merici's Church (Bronx) (917 Morris Ave.) – Established in 1899; staffed by the Apostles of Jesus (2000–present).
 Church of St. Anselm and St. Roch (Bronx) (151st St. at Tinton Ave.) – Established in 1891; staffed by the Augustinian Recollects. Formerly staffed by the Benedictine friars.
 Church of St. Roch (525 Wales Avenue) - Established in 1899, merged with St. Anselm's 2015; St. Roch's deconsecrated 2017. 
 St. Anthony of Padua Church (Bronx) (822 E. 166th St.) – Established in 1903.

 St. Athanasius Church (Bronx) (Tiffany St. between Fox St. & Southern Blvd.) – Established in 1907.
 St. Augustine's Church (Bronx) (E. 167th St. at Franklin & Fulton Aves.) – Established in 1849.
 St. Benedict's Church (2969 Otis Ave.) – Established in 1923.
 Parish of St. Brendan and of St. Ann
 St. Brendan's Church (Bronx) (E. 207th St.) – Established in 1908. Merged with St. Ann 2015.
 St. Ann's Church (Bronx) (Bainbridge Ave. at Gun Hill Road) – Established in 1927, merged with St. Brendan's 2015; St. Ann's deconsecrated 2017.
 St. Clare of Assisi's Church (Bronx) (Hone Ave. at Rhinelander Ave.) – Established in 1929.
 St. Dominic's Church (Bronx) (Morris Park Ave. at Unionport Rd.) – Established in 1927; staffed by the Idente Missionaries.
 St. Frances de Chantal's Church (Bronx) (Harding Ave. at Throggs Neck Blvd.) – Established in 1927.
 St. Frances of Rome's Church (Bronx) (4307 Barnes Ave.) – Established in 1898.
 St. Anthony's Church (Bronx) (1496 Commonwealth Ave.) – Established in 1908; merged 2015.
 Church of Our Lady of Grace. -Personal parish established 1924; merged with Frances of Rome 2015.
 St. Francis Xavier's Church (Bronx) (1658 Lurting Ave.) – Established in 1928.
 St. Helena's Church (Bronx) (Olmstead Ave. at Benedict Ave.) – Established in 1940.
 St. Jerome's Church (Bronx) (230 Alexander Ave.) – Established in 1869.
 St. Joan of Arc's Church (Bronx) (174th St. at Stratford Ave.) – Established in 1949.
 St. John's Church (Bronx) (3021 Kingsbridge Ave.) – Established in 1877.
 Visitation of the Blessed Virgin Mary Church (Bronx, New York) (160 Van Cortlandt Park South) – Established in 1928; merged with St. John the Evangelist 2015. Visitation deconsecrated 2017.
 St. John Chrysostom's Church (Bronx) (985 E. 167th St.) – Established in 1899.
 St. Luke's Church (Bronx) (623 E. 138th St.) – Established in 1897.
 St. Lucy's Church (Bronx) (833 Mace Ave.) – Established in 1927.
 St. Margaret Mary's Church (Bronx) (1914 Morris Ave.) – Established in 1923.
 St. Margaret of Cortona's Church (Bronx) (6000 Riverdale Ave.) – Established in 1890.
 St. Gabriel's Roman Catholic Church (Bronx) (235th St. at Arlington and Netherland Aves.) – Established in 1939. Merged with St. Margaret's 2015.
 St. Martin of Tours' Church (Bronx) (664 Grote St.) – Established in 1897.

 St. Nicholas of Tolentine's Church (Bronx) (Fordham Rd. at University Ave.) – Established in 1906; staffed by the Augustinian Fathers
 St. Raymond's Church (Bronx) (Castle Hill Ave. at Tremont Ave.) – Established in 1842.
 St. Rita of Cascia - St. Pius V's Church (Bronx)
 Church of St. Simon Stock - St. Joseph (Bronx) (2191 Valentine Ave.) – Established in 1919; staffed by the Carmelite Fathers (1919–present). St. Joseph's Church (Bronx, New York) (1949 Bathgate Ave.) – Established in 1873, merged with St. Simon Stock in 2015, desacralized November 2017.
 St. Theresa of the Infant Jesus Church (Bronx) (2855 St. Theresa Ave.) – Established in 1927.
 St. Thomas Aquinas Church (1900 Crotona Pkwy.) – Established in 1890.
 SS. Peter and Paul's Church (Bronx) (833 St. Ann's Ave.) – Established in 1897
 Church of the Holy Family
 Blessed Sacrament Church (Bronx) (Beach Ave. at Gleason Ave.) – Established in 1927, merged with Holy Family 2015.
 St. John Vianney Cure of Ars Church (Bronx) - merged with Holy Family 2015.  
 Immaculate Conception Church (Bronx) (754 Gun Hill Rd.) – Established in 1903.
 Immaculate Conception of the Blessed Virgin Mary Church (Bronx) (150th St. at Melrose Ave.) – Established in 1853; staffed by the Redemptorist Fathers.
 Our Lady of Pity - Established 1908, closed 2007, demolished.
 Our Lady of the Assumption
 St. Mary Star of the Sea - merged with Assumption 2015.

Churches in Manhattan
Cathedral of St. Patrick (50th St. and Fifth Ave.) – Established in 1858
Church of the Annunciation (88 Convent Ave.) – Established in 1853; staffed by the Piarist Fathers.
 San Lorenzo Ruiz Chapel (New York City) (378 Broome St.) – Established in 2005.
 All Saints Church (New York City)  (129th St. at Madison Ave.) – Established in 1879; staffed by the Franciscan Friars. Closed in 2015.
 Corpus Christi Church (New York City)  (529 W. 121st St.) – Established in 1906.
 Church of Notre Dame (New York City) (405 W. 114th St.) – Established in 1910; formerly staffed by the Fathers of Mercy (1910–1960).
 Church of Our Lady of Esperanza  (624 W. 156th St.) – Established in 1912.
 Our Lady of Good Counsel Church (Manhattan)  (230 E. 90th St.) – Established in 1886.
 Our Lady of Guadalupe at St. Bernard's Church (New York City)  (328 W. 14th St.) – Established in 2003 as a result of a parish merger.
 Our Lady of Lourdes Church (New York City)  (472 W. 142nd St., between Amsterdam Ave. & Convent Ave.) – Established in 1901
Church of Our Lady of Mt. Carmel (Manhattan) (448 E. 116th St.) - Established in 1884; staffed by the Pallottine Fathers.

 Church of Our Lady of Sorrows (New York City)  (Pitt St. at Stanton St.) – Established in 1867; staffed by the Capuchin Friars. Formerly known as the Church of Our Lady of the Seven Dolors.
 Our Lady of Victory Church (Manhattan)  (60 William St.) – Established in 1944; previously located at 23 William St. (1944–45)
 St. Andrew's Church (New York City)  (20 Cardinal Hayes Pl.) – Established in 1842; staffed by the Blessed Sacrament Fathers. Merged with OLV 2015.
 Our Lady Queen of Martyrs Church (New York City)  (91 Arden St., near Broadway) – Established in 1927
 Our Saviour Church (Manhattan)  (59 Park Avenue at 38th St) – Established in 1955.
 Church of Our Lady of the Scapular–St. Stephen (142 E. 29th St.) – Established in 1990; merged with Our Saviour 2015.
 Chapel of the Sacred Hearts of Jesus & Mary - Established 1990; merged with St. Stephen/OLS 2007. 
 St. Cyril's Church (Mahattan) (62 St. Mark's Place) - Established in 1916; staffed by Slovenian Franciscan Friars.
SS. Cyril, Methodius, and Raphael's Church (New York City)  (502 W. 41st St.) – Established in 1974 from the merger of St. Raphael and SS. Cyril & Methodius (New York City) . Staffed by Croatian Franciscan Friars (1974–present).
 St. Agnes' Church (New York City) (141 E. 43rd St.) – Established in 1873.
 St. Aloysius Gonzaga's Church (New York City)  (219 W. 132nd St.) – Established in 1899; staffed by the Jesuit Fathers.
 St. Ann's Church (Manhattan)  (312 E. 110th St.)
 St. Lucy's Church (Manhattan) (344 E. 104th St.) – Established in 1900; staffed by the Sons of Divine Providence. Merged with St. Ann's 2015.
 St. Anthony of Padua Church (Manhattan)  (West Houston St. at Sullivan St.) – Established in 1866; staffed by the Franciscan Friars.
 St. Benedict the Moor's Church (New York City)  (342 W. 53rd St.) – Established in 1883 to serve the African-American community of the city; staffed by Spanish friars of the Third Order of Saint Francis (T.O.R.) from 1953 to ???. Parish has been reduced to mission status, and is maintained by members of the new Lumen Christi congregation.
 St. Catherine of Genoa's Church (New York City)  (506 W. 153rd St.) – Established in 1887.
 St. Catherine of Siena's Church (New York City)  (411 E. 68th St.) – Established in 1897 as a mission; 1907 as a parish. Staffed by the Dominican Fathers.
 St. Cecilia's Church and Convent (New York City)  (E. 106th St., between Park Ave. & Lexington Ave.) – Established in 1873; staffed by the Redemptorist Fathers (1939–present).
 Church of the Holy Agony (New York City) (98th St. at Third Ave.) – Established in 1930; formerly a mission of Our Lady of the Miraculous Medal. Staffed by the Vincentian Fathers. Parish merged with St. Cecilia's 2014; Holy Agony Church deconsecrated 2017.
 St. Charles Borromeo's Church (New York City)  (211 W. 141st St.) – Established in 1888.
 Chapel of the Resurrection (New York City) (276 W. 151st St.)
 Church of St. Elizabeth (New York City)  (W. 187th St. at Wadsworth Ave.) – Established in 1869; formerly located on 187th St. at Broadway (1869–1929).

 St. Emeric's Church (New York City) (Avenue D, between 12th St. & 13th St.) – Established in 1949.
 St. Francis de Sales (135 East 96th Street)
 St. Francis of Assisi's Church (New York City)  (135 W. 31st St.) – Established in 1844; staffed by the Franciscan Friars.
 St. Francis Xavier Church (Manhattan)   45 W. 16th St. – Established in 1847; staffed by the Jesuit Fathers.
 Church of St. Frances Xavier Cabrini (New York City)  (564 Main St., Roosevelt Island) – Established in 1973.
 St. Gregory the Great's Church (Manhattan) (144 W. 90th St.) – Established in 1907.
 Church of St. Ignatius Loyola (New York City) (980 Park Ave.) – Established in 1851; staffed by the Jesuit Fathers since 1866. Known as St. Lawrence O'Toole Church (1851–1866).
 St. Jean Baptiste's Church (New York City) (76th St. at Lexington Ave.) – Established in 1882; staffed by the Fathers of the Blessed Sacrament since 1900. A French-Canadian National Parish until 1957.
 St. Joseph of the Holy Family's Church (New York City) (125th St. at Morningside Ave.) Established in
 Church of St. Joseph (371 Sixth Avenue) – Established in 1829. Staffed by The Dominican Friars.
 St. Jude's Church (New York City) (204th St. at Tenth Ave.) – Established in 1949.
 Church of St. Malachy (49th St. at Eighth Ave.) – Established in 1902; known as the Actors' Chapel.
 St. Mark the Evangelist's Church (New York City) (West 138th St., near Lenox Ave.) – Established in 1907; staffed by the Holy Ghost Fathers (1912–present).
 St. Mary's Church (Manhattan) (Grand St. at Ridge St.) – Established in 1826.

 St. Michael's Church (Manhattan) (424 W. 34th St.)
 St. Monica's Church (Manhattan) (413 E. 79th St.) – Established in 1879.
 St. Elizabeth of Hungary Church (New York City)  (211 E. 83rd St.) – Established in 1887; formerly located on East Fourth St.; merged with St. Monica's 2016.
 St. Stephen of Hungary Church (New York City) (East 82nd St.) – Established in 1927; staffed by Franciscan Friars since 1922. Previously located on 14th Street {1905–1927}; merged with St. Monica 2016.
 St. Paul's Church (New York City) (113 E. 117th St.) – Established in 1834; staffed by the Institute of the Incarnate Word Fathers (1998–present).
 Holy Rosary Church (Manhattan) (119th St. at First Ave.) – Established in 1884; staffed by the Augustinian Friars since 1979. Merged with St. Paul's 2015; Holy Rosary deconsecrated 2017.
 Church of St. Paul the Apostle (New York City) (Columbus Ave. between 60th and 59th St.) – Established in 1876. Mother Church of the Paulist Fathers.
 Church of St. Peter (Barclay St. at Church St.) – Established in 1786; first parish in the diocese.
 Our Lady of the Holy Rosary's Church (New York City)  (7 State St.) – Established in 1884 as a mission; 1887 as a parish. Home to the National Shrine of St. Elizabeth Ann Seton. Merged with St. Peter's parish 2015.
 St. Joseph's Chapel (New York City) (385 South End Ave.) – Established in 1983.
 St. Rose of Lima's Church (Manhattan) (510 W. 165th St.) – Established in 1901.
 St. Stanislaus Bishop and Martyr's Church (New York City) (7th St. at First Ave.) – Established in 1872; stood at 318 Henry St. until 1900. Staffed by the Fathers of St. Paul the First Hermit.
 St. Theresa's Church (New York City) (Rutgers St. at Henry St.) – Established in 1862.
 St. Thomas More's Church (New York City) (67 E. 89th St.) – Established in 1950.
 St. Veronica's Church (Manhattan) (149 Christopher St.) – Established in 1886.
 Church of St. Vincent Ferrer (66th St. at Lexington Ave.)

 Church of the Annunication, Convent Avenue
 Church of the Ascension, Roman Catholic (Manhattan) (221 W. 107th St.) – Established in 1895.
 Church of the Blessed Sacrament (Manhattan) (West 71st Street, just east of Broadway) – Established in 1887.
 Church of the Epiphany (239 East 21st Street, at corner of Second Avenue) – Established in 1868.
 Church of the Good Shepherd (New York City) (608 Isham St.) – Established in 1911; formerly staffed by the Paulist Fathers. Currently staffed by the Capuchin Friars.
 Holy Cross Church (New York City) (329 W. 42nd Street, between 8th and 9th Aves.) – Established in 1852.
 St. John the Baptist Church (Manhattan) (210 W. 31st St. at Seventh Ave.) – Established in 1840; staffed by the Capuchin Friars; merged with Holy Cross 2015
 Church of the Holy Family – The United Nations Parish – (315 East 47th Street, between 1st and 2nd Aves.) – Established in 1924.
 Holy Innocents' Church (New York City) (37th St. at Broadway) – Established in 1868.
 Holy Name of Jesus Roman Catholic Church (96th St. at Amsterdam Ave.) – Established in 1892; staffed by the Franciscan Friars since 1990. Previously located at Bloomingdale Rd. at 97th St. {1868–1891}.
 Holy Trinity Church (Manhattan) (West 82nd St., near Amsterdam Ave.) – Established in 1898.
 Immaculate Conception Church (Manhattan) (414 East 14th St., near First Ave.) – Established in 1855.
 Church of the Incarnation (Manhattan) (175th St. at St. Nicholas Ave.) – Established in 1908.
 Chapel of the Resurrection (New York City) (276 W. 151st St.) – Established in 1907.
 Church of the Sacred Heart of Jesus (New York City) (457 W. 51st St.) – Established in 1876.
 Church of the Transfiguration, Roman Catholic (Manhattan) (29 Mott St.) – Established in 1827.
 St. Joseph Church, Chinatown (Manhattan) at 5 Monroe Street, Lower East Side; merged with Tranfiguration 2015.
 St. Joachim's Church (Manhattan) -Established in 1888; merged with St. Joseph's in 1967 during city's urban renewal; building demolished.
 St. James Roman Catholic Church (Manhattan) - Established in 1837; merged with St. Joseph's 2007, then the parish of St. Joseph/St. James merged with Tranfiguration 2015.
 St. Patrick's Old Cathedral (260–264 Mulberry St., between Prince St. and Houston St.) – Established in 1809
 Shrine Church of the Most Precious Blood (113 Baxter St.) – Established in 1891; staffed by the Franciscan Friars until 2014. Merged with Old St. Pat's 2015. 
 Church of the Most Holy Redeemer (Manhattan) - Established 1844.
Church of the Nativity (Manhattan) (Second Ave. at Second St.) – Established in 1842; formerly staffed by the Jesuit Fathers. Merged with Most Holy Redeemer 2015; Nativity deconsecrated 2017.
 Church of the Guardian Angel (Manhattan) - Established 1888.
 St. Columba Church (New York City)  (343 W. 25th St.) – Established in 1845. Merged with Guardian Angel 2015.
 Our Lady of Pompeii Church (Manhattan)
 St. John the Evangelist - Our Lady of Peace Catholic Church (East 55th St. at First Ave.) – Established in 2016. 
 St. Albert Church, established 1916, now closed.
 Parish of St. John Nepomucene, St. Frances Xavier Cabrinni, and St. John the Martyr. - Established 2015.

Churches in Staten Island
 St. Peter's Church (Staten Island, New York) – Staten Island's first; established 1839.
 Our Lady of Good Counsel's Church (Staten Island, New York) (10 Austin Place) – Established 1898.
 Church of Our Lady Queen of Peace (Staten Island, New York) (90 Third St.) – Established 1922.
 Church of Our Lady Star of the Sea (Staten Island, New York) (5371 Amboy Road) – Established 1935; former mission of Our Lady Help of Christians.
 St. Charles's Church (Staten Island, New York) (644 Clawson St.) – Established 1960.
 St. Clare's Church (Staten Island, New York) (110 Nelson Ave.) – Established 1925; largest congregation in Archdiocese.
 St. Patrick's Church (Staten Island, New York) – Established 1862.
 St. Rita's Church (Staten Island, New York)
 Church of the Blessed Sacrament (Staten Island, New York) (Forest Ave. at Manor Rd.) – Established 1910.
 Church of Our Lady Help of Christians (Staten Island, New York).
 Church of Our Lady of Pity (Staten Island, New York)
 St Anthony of Padua R C Church (Staten Island, New York) (24 Shelley Ave) - Established 1908; merged with Our Lady of Pity 2015.
 Church of the Holy Family (Staten Island, New York)
 St. Adalbert's Church (Staten Island, New York)
 St. Roch's Church (Staten Island, New York) (602 Richmond Ave.) – Established 1922; merged with St. Adalbert 2015. 
 Sacred Heart Church (Staten Island, New York)
 St. Teresa of the Infant Jesus's Church (Staten Island, New York) (1634 Victory Blvd.)
 St. Ann's Church (Staten Island, New York) (101 Cromwell Ave.)
 Our Lady of Mount Carmel–St. Benedicta, West Brighton - Established 1913.
 St. Benedicta, West Brighton - Established 1922; merged with Our Lady of Mt. Carmel 1957. St. Benedicta's Church demolished 1960.
 St. Mary of the Assumption, Port Richmond - Established in 1877; merged with Our Lady of Mt. Carmel August 2015. St. Mary of the Assumption was deconsecrated November 2017.
 St. Joseph's Church - Established 1848.
 St. Mary's Church (Staten Island, New York) (1101 Bay Street) – Established 1852; merged with St. Joseph 2015.
 Immaculate Conception
 Holy Child Church, Eltingville - Established 1966.
 Assumption - St. Paul Church, New Brighton - Established 2007.
 Parish of St. Christopher and of St. Margaret Mary - Established 2015.

Churches in Dutchess County
 Chapel of Our Lady of the Way (Hyde Park) Located on the Hyde Park campus of the Culinary Institute of America.
 Church of the Holy Trinity (Poughkeepsie)  – Established in 1921.
 Church of Immaculate Conception (Amenia) – Established in 1866.
 Church of St. Anthony (Pine Plains) – Established in 1958; mission of Immaculate Conception in Amenia (1913–1958). Merged with Immaculate Conception, Amenia in 2015.
 Chapel of St. Patrick (Millerton) – Established in 1867; desacralized November 30, 2017.
 Church of Our Lady of Mount Carmel (Poughkeepsie, New York) (Poughkeepsie) 
 Church of Regina Coeli (Hyde Park)  – Established in 1877.
 Chapel of St. Paul (Staatsburg) – Established in 1887.
 Church of St. Charles Borromeo (Dover Plains) – Established in 1936; formerly a mission of Immaculate Conception in Amenia (1866–1885) and St. John the Evangelist in Pawling (1885–1936).
 Church of St. Columba (Hopewell Junction)  – Established in 1992; former mission of Hopewell Junction in Hopewell Junction.
 Church of St. Denis (Hopewell Junction)  – Established in 1899; formerly a mission of St. Mary in Wappingers Falls (1874–1899).
Church of St. Joachim and St. John the Evangelist (Beacon) 
 Church of St. John the Evangelist (Pawling) – Established in 1885; formerly a mission of Immaculate Conception in Amenia (1869–1885).
 Church of St. Joseph (Millbrook)  – Established in 1890; formerly a mission of Immaculate Conception in Amenia (1870–1890).
 Immaculate Conception Church (Bangall, New York) - merged with St. Joseph, Millbrook 2015.
 St. Joseph's Chapel, Clinton Corners merged with St. Joseph's, Millbrook 2015.
 Church of St. Kateri Tekakwitha (LaGrangeville)  – Established in 2002; mission of St. Columba in Hopewell Junction (1998–2002).
 Church of St. Martin de Porres (Poughkeepsie)  – Established in 1852; formerly known as Church of the Nativity (1852–1962).
 Church of St. Mary, Mother of the Church (Fishkill)  – Established in 1953; mission of St. Joachim in Beacon (1861–1953).
Church of St. Mary (Wappingers Falls)  – Established in 1845.
 Church of St. Peter (Hyde Park) – Established in 1837.
 Church of St. Stanislaus (Pleasant Valley)  – Established in 1903; formerly staffed by the Society of Jesus.
 St. Mary - St. Joseph Church (Poughkeepsie, New York) - Established 2015.
 Parish of Good Shepherd and St. Joseph (Rhinebeck, New York)
 Parish of St. Christopher and St. Sylvia (Red Hook, New York) - Established 2015.

Churches in Orange County
 Church of Our Lady of Mount Carmel (Middletown)   – Staffed by the Carmelite Fathers.
 Church of St. Anastasia (Harriman)  – Established in 1899.
 Church of St. Columba (Chester) – Established in 1881; formerly a mission of St. John the Evangelist in Goshen (1875–1881).
 Church of St. Francis of Assisi (Newburgh) – Established in 1909.
 Church of St. John the Evangelist (Goshen) – Established in 1849.
 Church of St. Joseph (Florida) – Established in 1894.
 Chapel of St. Andrew Bobola (Pellets Island) – Established in 1945.
 Church of St. Joseph (Middletown)  – Established in 1865.
 Church of St. Mary (Washingtonville) 
 Church of St. Patrick (Highland Mills)  – Established in 1957; formerly a mission of St. Anastasia (1902–1957).
 Church of St. Paul (Bullville) – Staffed by the Carmelite Fathers.
 Church of St. Stanislaus (Pine Island) – Established in 1924; formerly a mission of St. Joseph in Florida (1912–1924).
 Church of St. Stephen the Martyr (Warwick)  – Established in 1865.
 Church of the Holy Cross (Middletown) – Established in 1999; formerly a mission of Our Lady of Mount Carmel Church in Middletown (1912–1999).
 Chapel of Our Lady of the Scapular (Unionville) – Established in 1948; formerly a mission of Our Lady of Mount Carmel Church in Middletown (1948–1999).
 Church of the Holy Name (Otisville) – Established in 1969.
 Church of the Holy Rosary (Greenwood Lake) – Established in 1954; formerly a mission of St. Stephen in Warwick (1925–1954).
 Church of the Immaculate Conception (Port Jervis) – Established in 1851; formerly a mission of St. Patrick in Newburgh (1841–1851).
 Church of the Most Sacred Heart (Port Jervis) – Administered by Immaculate Conception Church.
 Church of the Infant Saviour (Pine Bush) – Established in 1951; formerly a mission of Most Precious Blood in Walden.
 Chapel of Our Lady of the Valley (Walker Valley)
 Church of the Most Precious Blood (Walden)  – Established in 1893 and suppressed in 1894; reestablished in 1912. Formerly a mission of Holy Name of Mary in Montgomery (1872–1893, 1894–1912).
 Chapel of St. Benedict (Wallkill)
 Church of the Sacred Heart (Monroe)  – Established in 1957; formerly a mission of St. Columba in Chester (1881–1957).
 Church of the Sacred Heart (Newburgh) 
 Church of the Sacred Heart of Jesus (Highland Falls)  – Established in 1870.
 Chapel of the Blessed Sacrament (Fort Montgomery)
 Holy Name of Mary and Assumption Church (Montgomery)– Established in 1872; formerly a mission of St. John the Evangelist in Goshen (1868–1872).
 Church of the Assumption (Maybrook) Merged with HNM 2015.
 St. Thomas of Canterbury and St. Joseph (Cornwall-on-Hudson) – Established in 1870; formerly a mission of St. Patrick in Newburgh (1856–1870)
 Church of St. Joseph (New Windsor) – Established in 1962. Merged with St. Thomas 2015.
 Church of St. Patrick & St. Mary (Newburgh) – Established in 2015.
 Chapel of Our Lady of the Lake (Orange Lake) – Established in 1937.

Churches in Putnam County
 Church of Our Lady of Loretto (Cold Spring) – Established in 1834.
 Chapel of St. Joseph (Garrison) – Established in 1871.
 Church of St. James the Apostle (Carmel)  – Established in 1909.
 Chapel of Our Lady of the Lake (Lake Carmel) – Established in 1936; former mission of St. John the Evangelist in Mahopac (1936–1947).
 Church of St. John the Evangelist (Mahopac)  – Established in 1889; formerly a mission of St. Joseph in Croton Falls (1866–1889).
 Chapel of Our Lady Queen of Angels (Mahopac)
 Church of St. Lawrence O'Toole (Brewster)  – Established in 1877; formerly a mission of St. Joseph in Croton Falls (1871–1877).
 Church of the Sacred Heart of Jesus (Patterson)  – Established in 1957; formerly a mission of St. Lawrence O'Toole in Brewster (1934–1957).

Churches in Rockland County
 Church of the Immaculate Conception (Stony Point) – Established in 1982.   
 Church of Our Lady of the Sacred Heart (Tappan) – Established in 1952.
 Church of St. Aedan (Pearl River) – Established in 1966; formerly a mission of St. Margaret in Pearl River (1965–1966).
 Church of St. Anthony (Nanuet) – Established in 1904; formerly a mission of St. Paul in Congers (1899–1904).
 Church of St. Augustine (New City) – Established in 1957; formerly a mission of St. Anthony in Nanuet (1907–1957).
 Church of St. Boniface (Wesley Hills) – Established in 1966.
 Church of St. Catherine of Alexandria (Blauvelt) – Established in 1869.
 Church of St. Francis of Assisi (West Nyack) – Established in 1964.
 Church of St. Gregory Barbarigo (Garnerville) – Established in 1961.
 Church of St. Joseph (Spring Valley) – Established in 1893.
 Church of St. Margaret's (Pearl River, New York) – Established in
 Church of the Sacred Heart (Suffern) – Established in 1868; formerly known as St. Rose of Lima.
 Church of St. John (Piermont, New York) – Established in 1852.
 St. Peter and St. Mary of the Assumption Church (Haverstraw).
 Parish of St. Joan of Arc and of Our Lady of Mount Carmel (Sloatsburg).
 Church of Our Lady of Mount Carmel (Tuxedo Park) – Established in 1895. Merged with Joan of Arc 2015.
 Parish of St. Paul and of St. Ann (Congers) – Established in 2015

Churches in Sullivan County
 Church of Our Lady of the Assumption (Bloomingburg) – Staffed by the Carmelite Fathers.
 Church of St. Aloysius (Livingston Manor) – Established in 1899; mission of St. Peter in Liberty (1896–1899).
 Chapel of the Gate of Heaven (Roscoe) – Established in 1901.
 Chapel of the Sacred Heart (DeBruce) – Established in 1906.
 Church of St. Francis Xavier (Narrowsburg) – Staffed by the Franciscan Friars.
 Chapel of Our Lady of the Lake (Lake Huntington) – Established in 1919.
 Church of St. George–St. Francis – Established in 1981; formerly staffed by the Franciscan Friars (1880–2004).
 Church of St. Francis of Assisi (Youngsville) – Established as a mission of Holy Cross in Callicoon in 1908.
 Church of St. George (Jeffersonville) – Established as a mission of Holy Cross in Callicoon in 1880.
 Church of St. Joseph (Wurtsboro) – Established in 1880; mission of St. Andrew in Ellenville (1849–1880).
 Church of St. Mary (Obernburg) – Established in 1854; staffed by the Franciscan Friars (1895–present).
 Church of St. Peter Liberty) – Established in 1897; mission of St. Andrew in Ellenville (1872–1899).
 Church of St. Peter (Monticello) – Established in 1874; mission of St. Andrew in Ellenville (1864–1874).
 Chapel of St. Anne of the Lake (White Lake) – Established in 1913.
 Chapel of St. Joseph (Mongaup Valley) – Established in 1899.
 Church of the Holy Cross (Callicoon) – Established in 1876; staffed by the Franciscan Friars (1895–present).
 Chapel of St. Patrick (Long Eddy) – Established in 1904.
 Church of the Immaculate Conception (Woodbourne) – Established in 1957; mission of St. Andrew in Ellenville (1898–1957).
 Parish of Saint Anthony of Padua and of Saint Thomas Aquinas (Yulan) – Established in 2015; staffed by the Franciscan Friars.
 Chapel of the Sacred Heart (Pond Eddy)

Churches in Ulster County
 Church of Our Lady of Fatima (Plattekill) – Established in 1960; mission of St. Joseph in New Paltz. Formerly staffed by the Theatine Fathers.
 Church of St. Augustine (Highland) – Formerly a mission of St. James in Milton (1899–??)
 Church of St. Charles Borromeo (Gardiner) – Established in 1882 and suppressed in 1885; reestablished in 1892 and suppressed in 1929; reestablished in 1976. Formerly a mission of St. James in Milton (1885–1892) and a mission of St. Joseph in New Windsor (1929–1976).
 Church of St. Francis de Sales (Phoenicia) – Established in 1902; formerly staffed by the La Salette Fathers (1902–2004).
 Church of St. John (West Hurley) – Established in 1860.
 Chapel of St. Augustine (West Shokan)
 Church of St. John the Evangelist (Saugerties) 
 Church of St. Joseph (Kingston) – Established in 1868.
 Church of St. Joseph (New Paltz)  – Established in 1929; formerly a mission of St. Charles Borromeo in Gardiner (1892–1929). Staffed by the Capuchin Friars.
 Church of St. Mary and St. Andrew  (Ellenville) – Established in 1956 from the merger of St. Mary & St. Andrew Churches.
 Chapel of Our Lady of Lourdes (Kerhonkson) – Established in 1957.
 Church of St. Peter (Rosendale) – Established in 1860.
 Chapel of Our Lady Help of Christians (High Falls)
 Church of the Immaculate Conception (Kingston) – Established in 1896.
 St. Mary of the Snow - St. Joseph Church (Saugerties, New York) - Established 2015.
 Parish of St. Catherine Labouré - St. Colman (Lake Katrine)
 Chapel of St. Anne (Sawkill) – Established in 1905 and suppressed in 1972; formerly a mission of St. Joseph in Kingston.
 Parish of the Presentation of the Blessed Virgin Mary and of the Sacred Heart (Port Ewen) – Established in 2015; staffed by the Redemptorist Fathers (1913–present).
 Parish of St. Mary and of Saint James (Marlboro) – Established in 2015; formerly a mission of the Presentation of the B.V.M. in Port Ewen and of St. James in Milton (1867–1900).
 Chapel of Our Lady of Mercy (Roseton) – Established in 1887; formerly a mission of St. James in Milton (1887–1900).
 Parish of St. Mary/Holy Name of Jesus and of Saint Peter (Kingston) – Established in 2015.

Churches in Westchester County

 Church of the Assumption (Peekskill) – Established in 1859. 
 Church of the Blessed Sacrament (New Rochelle) – Established in 1848 as a mission; 1853 as a parish. Formerly named St. Matthew Church (1848–1875) and located on Drake's Lane.
 Church of Christ the King (Yonkers) – Established in 1927.
 Church of the Holy Family (New Rochelle) – Established in 1913
 Church of the Holy Innocents (Pleasantville) – Established in 1894; staffed by the Dominican Fathers (1897–present).
 Church of the Holy Name of Jesus (New Rochelle)
 Church of the Holy Name of Jesus (Valhalla) – Established in 1896; formerly staffed by the Dominican Fathers (1896–1998).
 Church of the Holy Name of Mary (Croton-on-Hudson) – Established in 1877.
 Church of the Holy Rosary (Hawthorne)
 Church of the Holy Spirit (Cortlandt Manor) - Established in 1966
 Church of the Immaculate Conception (Irvington) – Established in 1873.
 Church of the Immaculate Conception (Sleepy Hollow)

 Church of the Immaculate Conception/St. Mary (Yonkers) – Established in 1848.
Church of the Immaculate Heart of Mary (Scarsdale) – Established in 1912.
 Church of the Magdalene (Tarrytown) – Established in 1894.
 Church of the Most Holy Trinity (Mamaroneck) – Built 1885-1886. 
 Church of Our Lady of Fatima {Portuguese} (Yonkers)
 Church of Our Lady of Mount Carmel (Elmsford) – Established in 1912.
 Church of Our Lady of Mount Carmel (Yonkers) – Staffed by the Pallotine Fathers.
 Church of Our Lady of Shkodra (Hartsdale) – Established in 1999.
 Church of Our Lady of Sorrows (White Plains)
 Church of Our Lady of Victory (Mount Vernon) – Established in 1871 and known as St. Jacob Church until 1894. Staffed by the Scalabrinian Fathers since 2002.
Church of the Resurrection (Rye) – Established in 1880.
 Church of the Sacred Heart (Hartsdale)
 Church of the Sacred Heart (Yonkers) –  Established in 1891; staffed by the Capuchin Friars. 
 Church of the Sacred Heart (Mount Vernon) – Established in 1872; formerly a mission of St. Raymond in the Bronx (1849–1872). Formerly named St. Matthew Church (1849–1872).* Church of Our Lady of the Rosary/Holy Rosary (Port Chester) – Staffed by the Salesian Fathers of Don Bosco. Closed and Merged with Our Lady of Victory in 2015.
 Church of St. Ann (Ossining)
 Church of St. Ann (Yonkers) Established in 1929

 Church of St. Anthony (Yonkers) – Established in 1923.
 Church of St. Anthony of Padua (West Harrison) – Formerly a mission of St. John and St. Mary in Chappaqua (1926–1929) and of Our Lady of Sorrows in White Plains (1929–?)
Church of St. Augustine (Larchmont) – Established in 1891.
 Church of St. Augustine (Eagle Park) – Established in 1853.
 Church of St. Bartholomew (Yonkers) – Staffed by the Missionary Society of St. Paul Fathers.
 Church of St. Bernard (White Plains)
 Church of St. Casimir (Yonkers) – Established in 1899; staffed by the Pauline Fathers.
 Church of St. Columbanus (Cortlandt Manor) – Established in 1950.
 Chapel of the North American Martyrs (Lake Peekskill) – Established in 1937; formerly a mission of St. Patrick in Yorktown Heights (1937–50), Administered by St. Columbanus Parish in Cortlandt Manor.
 Church of St. Elizabeth Ann Seton (Shrub Oak)
 Church of St. Eugene (Yonkers) – Established in 1949.
 Church of St. Francis of Assisi (Mount Kisco) – Established in 1871; formerly a mission of St. Joseph in Croton Falls (1862–1871).
 Church of St. Gregory the Great (Harrison)
 Church of St. John and St. Mary (Chappaqua)
 Church of St. John the Baptist (Yonkers) – Established in 1903.
 Church of the Most Holy Trinity (Yonkers) – Established in 1894, merged with John the Baptist 2015.
 Church of St. Joseph (Bronxville) - Established in 1922.
 Church of St. Joseph (Somers) – Established in 1845. Formerly located in Croton Falls, relocated to Somers in 2013.
 Chapel of St. John (North Salem) – Established in 1916. Closed in 2014. 
 Chapel of St. Michael the Archangel (Goldens Bridge) – Established in 1896. Closed in 2014. 
 Church of St. Joseph (Yonkers) – Established in 1871.
 Church of St. Margaret of Hungary (Yonkers)
 Church of St. Mary (Mount Vernon) – Established in 1894.
 Church of Our Lady of Mount Carmel (Mount Vernon) – Established in 1897; formerly staffed by the Franciscan Friars. Closed and merged with St. Mary's 2015.
 Church of St. Mary of the Assumption (Katonah) – Established in 1908; formerly a mission of St. Joseph in Croton Falls (1889–1908).
 Chapel of St. Matthias (Bedford Hills)- Administered by the Parish of St. Mary of the Assumption in Katonah.
 Church of St. Stanislaus Kostka (Hastings-on-Hudson) – Administered by St. Matthew Church since 1986. While still listed on the Archdiocese website as a parish, the church building was closed in 2005 and has since been sold.
 Church of St. Patrick (Bedford)
 Church of St. Patrick (Yorktown Heights) – Established in 1898; formerly named St. Peter Church (1898–1933).
 Church of St. Patrick (Armonk) – Established in 1966; formerly a mission of St. John & St. Mary in Chappaqua (1924–1966).
 Church of St. Paul the Apostle (Yonkers) – Established in 1923.
 Church of St. Peter (Yonkers) – Established in 1894.
 Church of St. Denis (Yonkers, New York) - closed and merged with St. Peter's 2015.
 Church of St. Pius X (Scarsdale) – Established in 1954. Formerly staffed by Diocesan Priests, currently staffed and under the pastoral care of the Religious Community of the Disciples of Mary. 
 Church of St. Teresa of Avila (Sleepy Hollow) – Established in 1853.
 Church of St. Vito (Mamaroneck) – Established in 1911.
 Church of the Holy Cross (Sleepy Hollow) – Established in 1922; formerly a mission of Most Holy Trinity in Yonkers (1910–1922). Administered by St. Teresa of Avila Church.
 Church of St. Theresa, the Little Flower (Briarcliff Manor) – Established in 1926.
 Chapel of Our Lady of the Wayside (Millwood) – Established in 1924; formerly a mission of St. John & St. Mary in Chappaqua (1924–1926).
 Church of Sts. John and Paul (Larchmont) – Established in 1949.
 Church of Sts. Peter and Paul (Mount Vernon) – Established in 1929.
 Church of St. Ursula (Mount Vernon, New York) - Closed and merged with SS Peter and Paul 2015.
 Chapel of Our Lady of Pompeii (Pleasantville) – Established in 1918.
 Chapel of the Good Shepherd (Croton-on-Hudson) – Mission established in 1929.
 Church of the Transfiguration (Tarrytown) – Established in 1896; staffed by the Carmelite Fathers.
 Church of St. Christopher and of St. Patrick(Buchanan, New York) – Established in 1929.
 Church of St. Patrick (Verplanck) – Established in 1843. Merged with St. Christopher 2015.
 Parish of Our Lady of Perpetual Help and of St. Catharine (Pelham Manor, New York) – Established in 2015 as a result of the mergers of OLPH and St. Catharine's.
 Parish of St. Gabriel and of St. Joseph (New Rochelle, New York) - Established 2015.
 Parish of Immaculate Conception and of Assumption (Tuckahoe, Westchester County, New York) – Established in 1878; formerly a mission of Blessed Sacrament in New Rochelle (1853–1878).
 Church of the Assumption (Tuckahoe) – Established in 1911; administered by Immaculate Conception Church. Merged with IC 2015.
 Parish of Annunciation and of Our Lady of Fatima (Crestwood, New York) Annunciation established in 1931, merged parish established in 2015. 
 Church of Our Lady of Fatima (Scarsdale) – Established in 1948. Merged with Annunciation 2015.
 Parish of St. Matthew and of Our Lady of Perpetual Help (Hastings-on-Hudson) – Established in 2015.
 Parish of the Sacred Heart and of Our Lady of Pompeii (Dobbs Ferry) – Established in 2015.
 Parish of St. John the Evangelist and of Our Lady of Mount Carmel (White Plains) – Established in 2015.
 Parish of St. John Bosco (Port Chester) – Established in 2017.
Our Lady of Mercy Church (Port Chester) – Established in 1854; head church of the Parish of St. John Bosco.
Corpus Christi Church (Port Chester) – Merged into the parish of St. John Bosco.
Our Lady of the Rosary Church (Port Chester) – Merged into the parish of St. John Bosco.
Sacred Heart of Jesus Church (Port Chester) – Closed and Merged into the parish of St. John Bosco.

†.Parish practices the Extraordinary Form

List of Eastern-Rite Churches in the Archdiocese

Churches in New York City

Churches in the Bronx
 Ukrainian Church of St. Mary Protectress (1745 Washington Ave.) – Established in 1943.
 St. Thomas Syro Malabar Catholic Church (Bronx, NY) - Established in 2002

Churches in Manhattan
 Russian Church of St. Michael (266 Mulberry Street) - Established in 1936.
 Ruthenian Church of St. Mary (246 E. 15th St.) – Established in 1912.
 Ukrainian Church of St. George (E. 7th St.) – Established in 1905.

Churches in Staten Island
 Ukrainian Church of the Holy Trinity (288 Vanderbilt Ave.) – Established in 1949.

Churches in Orange County
 Ukrainian Church of St. Andrew (Hamptonburgh) – Established in 1983.

Churches in Rockland County
 Ukrainian Church of Sts. Peter & Paul (Spring Valley) – Established in 1913.

Churches in Sullivan County

 Ukrainian Church of St. Volodymyr (Glen Spey) – Established in 1961.

Churches in Ulster County
 Ukrainian Church of the Holy Trinity (Kerhonkson) – Established in 1965.

Churches in Westchester County
 Ruthenian Church of St. Nicholas of Myra (Yonkers) – Established in 1891.
 St. Nicholas of Myra Byzantine Catholic Church, (White Plains) - Current church constructed in 1987. The Yonkers church closed in 2010, and parishioners moved to the White Plains church.  
 Ukrainian Church of St. Michael (Yonkers) – Established in 1898.
St. John Paul II Maronite Catholic Church (Tarrytown)- Established in 2014.

See also
List of Catholic churches in the United States

References

External links
 Bronx Catholic Churches in a directory.

Chur
New York